The Zhengzhou–Jinan high-speed railway is a high-speed railway in China.

History
On 31 August 2016, a feasibility study was published which investigated the construction of a railway between Zhengzhou and Jinan. At the time, it was expected to be completed by 2020.

Construction officially began on 18 June 2020. The line is expected to be completed by 2023. The section between Zhengzhou East and Puyang East began operation on 20 June 2022.

Stations

References

High-speed railway lines in China
High-speed railway lines under construction